The Valencia Municipality is one of the 14 municipalities (municipios) that makes up the Venezuelan state of Carabobo and, according to the 2011 census by the National Institute of Statistics of Venezuela, the municipality has a population of 829,856. The city of Valencia is the shire town of the Valencia Municipality.

History
The city of Valencia has been an active participant of Venezuela's history. Valencia was founded by Captain Alonso Díaz Moreno on March 25, 1555 — as the locals are proud of reminding visitors, eight years before Caracas.  It was the first Spanish settlement in central Venezuela and its official name was Nuestra Señora de la Asunción de Nueva Valencia del Rey.  The infamous conquistador Lope de Aguirre besieged the city in 1561.  In 1677 it was raided by French pirates, who burnt down its City Hall, thus destroying  many very important documents about the early settlement of Venezuela. The German scientist Alexander von Humboldt visited the city on his trip through the Americas. He reported that at the time of his visit the city had around 6000 to 7000  inhabitants.  On June 24, 1821, the Battle of Carabobo was fought on the outskirts of the city, sealing the Independence of Venezuela from imperial Spanish rule.

Media
The main newspaper servicing Valencia is "The Carabobian" or "Diario El Carabobeño" . In May 2007, many universities in Venezuela, including within Valencia, held demonstrations protesting the non-renewal of the broadcast license of Venezuelan Television station, Radio Caracas Televisión (RCTV).  RCTV has been at odds with Venezuelan president Hugo Chávez.

Sites of interest

Art centers
Ateneo de Valencia
Teatro Municipal de Valencia

Museums
Casa Páez
Casa de los Celis, settlement of the Museum of Art and History and the Lisandro Alvarado Foundation. 
Museum of History and Anthropology 
Iturriza Palace, or Quinta Isabela, Museum of the city (Museo de la Ciudad).

Parks and points of interest
Negra Hipólita Park or Fernand Peñalver Park
Metropolitan Park (Parque Metropolitano)
Valencia's Aquarium (Acuario de Valencia) (ranks as largest aquarium in Latin America)
Plaza Monumental de Valencia, second largest bullring in the world.

Demographics
The Valencia Municipality, according to a 2007 population estimate by the National Institute of Statistics of Venezuela, has a population of 830,420 (up from 756,605 in 2000). This amounts to 37.3% of the state's population.

Government
The mayor of the Valencia Municipality is Edgardo Parra, elected on November 23, 2008 with 38% of the vote.  He replaced Francisco Cabrera Santos shortly after the elections. The municipality is divided into nine parishes: 
 Candelaria
 Catedral
 El Socorro
 Miguel Peña Parish
 Rafael Urdaneta
 San Blas
 San José
 Santa Rosa 
 Negro Primero

Transportation
The city is well connected with the rest of the country by a network of highways and roads well maintained by INVIAL.

A modern metro system is being constructed that will connect the city's remote suburbs with the downtown area.
Buses are the main means of mass transportation. There are two bus systems: the traditional system and the VALBUS. The traditional system runs a variety of bus types, operated by several companies on normal streets and avenues:
bus; large buses.
buseta; medium size buses.
microbus or colectivo; vans or minivans.
The airport, Arturo Michelena International Airport (SVVA), is the nation's third busiest. It is served by all major Venezuelan airlines.

Sister cities
Valencia is twinned with:

 Naples, Italy
  Valencia, Spain
 Sibiu, Romania
 Naguanagua, Venezuela
  Plovdiv, Bulgaria

See also
Valencia
Carabobo
Municipalities of Venezuela

References

External links
valencia-carabobo.gob.ve 

Municipalities of Carabobo